Amjad Zia (born in Sialkot Cantt) is a field hockey player from USA of Pakistan origin, who start playing at the age of twelve.  Have previously played his hockey in Pakistan, representing his district, regional and provincial teams.  For a brief period represented The Packages Limited hockey team and later, just before immigrating to the USA, was selected for the national junior training squad.

Due to lack of opportunities for men's hockey in the state of his residence at the time, he stopped playing competitive hockey.  Later engaged in the coaching and umpiring in the state of Virginia.  Which he continued when he migrated to East Anglia in England (1996), where umpire's coaches saw the potential of him umpiring at a higher leave and added his name to the umpires development list.  But he was unable to resist playing opportunities and decide to return to playing and coaching hockey, and later attended the FIH coaching seminar in 2000 during the FIH Champions Trophy in Amstelveen, Netherlands.

In 2012 he was selected to represent the USA Masters over 45's team in the FIH inaugural Masters World Cup in Canterbury, England, and earned his first Masters cap against Australia. Later represented USA Masters over 50's in European Open in Northern Ireland (2013), 2nd FIH Masters World Cup in Rotterdam, the Netherlands (2014) and 3rd FIH Masters World cup in Canberra, Australia (2016).

References 

1962 births
American male field hockey players
Living people
American people of Pakistani descent